The South American (CONMEBOL) zone of qualification for the 1990 FIFA World Cup saw 9 teams competing for 2 direct places at the finals, with one extra place potentially on offer to the winner of a play-off. CONMEBOL member Argentina qualified automatically as reigning World Cup champions.

Format
Teams were divided into 3 groups of 3 teams each. The teams would play against each other on a home-and-away basis. The 2 group winners with the best record would qualify. The group winner with the worst record would advance to the CONMEBOL / OFC Intercontinental Play-off.

Draw
The draw for the qualifying groups took place in Zürich, Switzerland on 12 December 1987. During the draw teams were drawn from 3 seeded pots into the 3 qualifying groups.

Group 1

Uruguay qualified with the second-best record among the group winners.

Group 2

Colombia advanced to the CONMEBOL / OFC Intercontinental Play-off with the worst record among the group winners.

Group 3

Brazil qualified with the best record among the group winners.

 

 

 

 

 

1The match was abandoned in the 67th minute with Brazil leading 1–0 after Chile walked off the field when a firecracker thrown from the crowd supposedly hit goalkeeper Roberto Rojas in the head, leaving him bloodied and having to be carried from the pitch on a stretcher; a subsequent FIFA investigation found that Rojas's injury was self-inflicted, using a razor blade concealed in his glove. On 13 September, the match was awarded 2–0 to Brazil, and Chile were banned from qualifying for the next World Cup. Rojas was given a lifetime ban from competitive football (lifted in 2001), as was Chile manager Orlando Aravena, vice-captain Fernando Astengo and team doctor Daniel Rodriguez.

Inter-confederation play-offs
  The winner of this play-off qualified for the 1990 FIFA World Cup.

Qualified teams
The following four teams from CONMEBOL qualified for the final tournament.

1 Bold indicates champions for that year. Italic indicates hosts for that year.

Goalscorers

5 goals

 Careca
 Rubén Sosa

4 goals

 Arnoldo Iguarán

3 goals

 Juan Carlos Letelier

2 goals

 Bebeto
 Jorge Aravena
 Raúl Aviles
 Javier Ferreira

1 goal

 José Milton Melgar
 Tito Montaño
 Álvaro Peña
 William Ramallo
 Erwin Sánchez
 Branco
 Romário
 Paulo Silas
 Ivo Basay
 Jaime Vera
 Patricio Yáñez
 Iván Zamorano
 Rubén Darío Hernández
 Albeiro Usuriaga
 Álex Aguinaga
 Pietro Marsetti
 Roberto Cabañas
 José Luis Chilavert
 Alfredo Mendoza
 Gustavo Neffa
 Andrés Aurelio González
 José del Solar
 Antonio Alzamendi
 Enzo Francescoli
 Ildemaro Fernández

1 own goal

 Hugo González (playing against Brazil)
 Alfonso Domínguez (playing against Bolivia)
 Pedro Acosta (playing against Brazil)

Notes

External links
 South American zone at FIFA.com

 
CONMEBOL
FIFA World Cup qualification (CONMEBOL)
World